Thomas Beloat was a sheriff of Gibson County, Indiana at the turn of the 20th century noted for stopping a lynching in the county seat of Princeton. He was the subject of a June 10, 1901 article in the New York Tribune. His bravery is also mentioned by Mark Twain in his 1901 essay The United States of Lyncherdom.

A Republican, he served as sheriff from January 1, 1901, through December 31, 1904. He was a charter member of the Gibson County Sons of Veterans organization.

References

Year of birth missing
Year of death missing
People from Gibson County, Indiana
Lynching in the United States
Indiana sheriffs
Indiana Republicans
Princeton, Indiana